"December, 1963 (Oh, What a Night)" is a song originally performed by the Four Seasons, written by original Four Seasons keyboard player Bob Gaudio and his future wife Judy Parker, produced by Gaudio, and included on the group's album, Who Loves You (1975).

The song features drummer Gerry Polci on lead vocals, with Frankie Valli, the group's usual lead vocalist, singing the bridge sections and backing vocals and bass player Don Ciccone singing the falsetto part.

Song origins
According to the co-writer and longtime group member Bob Gaudio, the song's lyrics were originally set in 1933 with the title "December 5th, 1933," and celebrated the repeal of Prohibition, but the lyrics were changed at the urgings of Frankie Valli and lyricist Parker to reposition the song as a nostalgic remembrance of a young man's first affair with a woman, and, more specifically, Gaudio's courtship with his wife, Judy Parker.

Reception
The single was released in December 1975 and hit number one on the UK Singles Chart on February 21, 1976. It repeated the feat on the US Billboard Hot 100 on March 13, 1976, remaining in the top spot for three weeks and one week on Cash Box. Billboard ranked it as the No. 4 song for 1976. On April 10 the same year, it topped the RPM National Top Singles Chart in Canada. It was the final Four Seasons' song to reach number one, although Valli would have one final chart-topper as a solo act in 1978 with the theme song to the film Grease.

Billboard said that it has "the flavor and fun of '60s rock with a disco feel," and praised the production and the lead and harmony vocals as well."  Cash Box said it has "one of the sweetest melody lines you'll have heard throughout 1975" and that the song is "easy enough to sing along to, combined with an unforgettable bass line." Record World called it a "disco flavored item in [the Four Seasons'] timeless harmony mold."

Ben Liebrand remix
In 1988, Dutch DJ and producer Ben Liebrand remixed the song and re-released it as a single. In 1993, Curb Records, who released the original version of the song, picked up the 1988 remix and released it to the U.S. market. The 1993 re-release spent 27 weeks on the Hot 100 (matching the chart life of the original 1975 single).  The peak position of the remix version was #14.  Adding together the two 27-week chart runs for the 1975 original single and the remixed version (for a combined total of 54 weeks, two more weeks than a full year) gave the song the longest tenure ever on the Billboard Hot 100 music chart up to that time. This remixed version has a duration of five minutes.

Music video
A music video was produced to accompany the original 1975 release.

Personnel 

 Gerry Polci – drums, co-lead and backing vocals
 Frankie Valli – co-lead vocals
 Don Ciccone – bass, co-lead and backing vocals
 John Paiva – electric guitar
 Lee Shapiro – keyboards, synthesizers, horn and string arrangements

Charts

Weekly charts

Year-end charts

Certifications

Clock version

British pop-dance act Clock released a dance cover of "Oh What a Night" in August 1996. It peaked at number 13 in both Ireland and in the UK; in the latter country, it stayed at its peak for four nonconsecutive weeks.

Track listings

Charts

Weekly charts

Year-end charts

Other covers
The French singer Claude François also recorded a version of this song called "Cette année-là". Singers of musical Belles belles belles covered the Claude François' song.

References

External links
 

1975 songs
1975 singles
1976 singles
1994 singles
1996 singles
Billboard Hot 100 number-one singles
Cashbox number-one singles
UK Singles Chart number-one singles
Number-one singles in South Africa
RPM Top Singles number-one singles
The Four Seasons (band) songs
Clock (dance act) songs
Songs about nostalgia
Songs written by Bob Gaudio
Song recordings produced by Bob Gaudio
Disco songs
Warner Records singles
Curb Records singles
MCA Records singles
Songs about nights